Raimo Partanen (born 9 August 1940) is a Finnish skier. He competed in the Nordic combined event at the 1964 Winter Olympics.

References

External links
 

1940 births
Living people
Finnish male Nordic combined skiers
Olympic Nordic combined skiers of Finland
Nordic combined skiers at the 1964 Winter Olympics
People from Ruokolahti
Sportspeople from South Karelia
20th-century Finnish people